Ayez Shaukat-Fonseka Farid (born July 19, 1987) is a Malaysian professional wrestler who performs under his shortened name, Shaukat. He is best known for being Malaysia's first and most successful professional wrestler.

Professional wrestling career 
In 2013, Shaukat, a then stunt-actor won a contest to have a lunch with WWE Hall of Famer, Booker T. He inspired Shaukat to start professional wrestling in Malaysia. Shaukat would then co-found wrestling promotion and school, Malaysia Pro Wrestling (MYPW). In 2016, MYPW would have its first public showcase. In 2020, Shaukat would part ways with MYPW to start a new promotion called APAC Wrestling. In 2022, Shaukat would appear on Reality of Wrestling. He would wrestle two matches for Reality of Wrestling, defeating Johnathan Vegas and Tommy Bolton. As of late 2022, Shaukat continues to wrestle, training 30 students.

Championships and accomplishments 

 Hong Kong Pro Wrestling Federation
 AWGC Junior Heavyweight Title (1 time) 
 Malaysia Pro Wrestling
 MYPW World-To-Regional Championship 
 Singapore Pro Wrestling
 SPW Southeast Asian Championship (1 time) 
 Southern Territory Wrestling
 STW Ambition Global Championship (1 time, current)

References 

1987 births
Living people
21st-century professional wrestlers
Malaysian professional wrestlers